Ferrara Balloons Festival is a yearly hot air balloon festival that takes place in Ferrara, Italy and is considered to be one of the largest festivals of hot air ballooning in Europe, with numerous teams from Italy and other parts of the world bringing their traditional or uniquely shaped aircraft. It lasts for ten days. 

The first festival began in 2005. One of the most popular features of the Festival is the ascent of balloons in the sky, all set off from the Bassani Urban Park just outside the Renaissance city walls of the UNESCO World Heritage City.

Organised by the city council and the provincial administration of Ferrara, the festival also features concerts, shows, entertainment and a grand Village of the Air with attractions, shops and food outlets.

There was no festival in 2020.

See also 
 Hot air balloon festivals

External links 
Ferrara Balloons Festival official site
Ferrara Official Touristic Site
Italian Unesco Association
Po Delta Park

Hot air balloon festivals